The Thomas Gray House is a historic house at 25 River Valley Road in Little Rock, Arkansas.  It is a single-story masonry structure, finished in fieldstone and vertical cedar siding and covered by a gable-on-hip roof.  A contemporaneous detached carport with a similar roof stands near the house.  The house was designed by Thomas Gray, an architect at the prominent Little Rock firm Wittenberg, Delony & Davidson, as his family's residence.  It is a locally significant example of the Organic architecture movement.

The house was listed on the National Register of Historic Places in 2018.

See also
National Register of Historic Places listings in Little Rock, Arkansas

References

Houses on the National Register of Historic Places in Arkansas
Houses completed in 1963
Houses in Little Rock, Arkansas
National Register of Historic Places in Little Rock, Arkansas